Hiisi (plural hiidet ) is a term in Finnic mythologies, originally denoting sacred localities and later on various types of mythological entities.

In later, Christian-influenced folklore, they are depicted as demonic or trickster-like entities, often the autochthonous, pagan inhabitants of the land, similar in this respect to mythological giants. They are found near salient promontories, ominous crevasses, large boulders, potholes, woods, hills, and other outstanding geographical features or rough terrain.

Origin and etymology
Hiisi was originally a spirit of hill forests . In Estonian hiis (or his) means a sacred grove in trees, usually on elevated ground. In the spells ("magic songs") of the Finns the term Hiisi is often used in association with a hill or mountain, as a personage he also associated with the hills and mountains, such as the owner or ruler of the same. His name is also commonly associated with forests, and some forest animals.

More recent speculation, by Mauno Koski and others, associates the Finnish "Hiisi" and the Estonian "Hiis" primarily with burial sites, or sacred areas associated with burial sites; with a secondary meaning of hiisi applied to dominant, exceptional or anomalous geographical features. Following the Christianization of Finland and Estonia these meanings may have been lost or become unclear, which may have led to the application of anthropomorphism to hiisi sites, as "giant's ...", or the emergence of Hiisi or Hiis as a proper noun, the name of a deity or spirit.

It has been supposed that Hiisi's evil nature has been magnified over time, starting with the Christianization of Finland in the 12th and 13th centuries. In more recent times his nature has been nearly identical with that of a Christian devil,or even the Devil. In Bishop Mikael Agricola's list of Finnish pagan gods Hiisi is said to have been a god of forest game or fur, sharing this attribute with a similar god, Tapio.

Folklore
Oral folklore concerning hiisi mostly describes creatures that dwelt in hiisi sites, typically trolls or giants. Many of the stories describe how  odd rock formations or other features of the landscape were created by the actions of these creatures.

Much of the recorded folklore about hiisi comes from the village of Narva in Vesilahti, Finland. There are tales of  cauldrons of coins being caught by fishermen after having rolled down the cliff at Hiidennokka, as well as tales of how the cape of Hiidennokka was created by giants throwing rocks. One of these tales takes on a Christian element, as the giants throw rocks into the sea to prevent people going to church by boat.

Later the original aspect of nature's awesomeness inherent in the hiidet was diminished, and they passed into folklore as purely evil spirits vaguely analogous to trolls. According to this later view, hiidet were often small in size, but others were gigantic. Hiidet could travel in a noisy procession and attack people who did not give way to them. If somebody left their door open, a hiisi could come inside and steal something. If you were chased by a hiisi. you should seek safety in a cultivated area. In folklore, it was the cultivated areas that were blessed in contrast to the pagan holiness residing in the awesome and forbidding features of raw nature, and an evil hiisi could not step inside areas sanctified by cultivation.

Geographical objects and names
In 1933 a Finnish archaeologist, Aarne Michaёl Tallgren, identified 15 or 16 potential Hiisi locations, and in 1967 a linguist, Mauno Koski, identified 14 Iron Age cemeteries as Hiisi sites. Both based their lists primarily on the presence of an element of the word hiisi in placenames. These locations include cup marked stones, sacred trees and springs. The term hiisi appears as a compound element in placenames such as Hiisimäki [hiisi hill].

The Finnish term for a prehistoric cairn grave is a hiidenkiuas [hiisi's sauna stove]. A giant's kettle is called a hiidenkirnu [hiisi's churn].

The settlement of Hiitola takes its name from the spirit.

Linguistic usage

In "Magic Songs"

Hiisi was often used as a prefix in figurative expressions referring to certain things in Finnish life when casting spells ("magic songs")- for example for animals (in English): "Hiisi's bandy legs": a Hare; "braid of hair of Hiisi's girl", or "Hiisi's scourge": a Snake; "Hiisi's eye": A Lizard.; "Hiisi's bird": a Hornet;. The same was used for diseases and afflictions: "Hound of Hiisi": disease causing principle; "Hiisi's son", "Hiisi's cat": Toothache; "Hiisi's toadstool", "Hiisi's filth": tumors or swellings, etc. - the term "Hiisi" alone was also used for ailments, Tempo and Juntas's names were also used in similar contexts.

Hiisi's name was also used in curses - such as one against envy :

In such incantations Hiisi's name often carries negative connotations, being associated with waste, pain, punishment and so on.

However, not all associations were negative - Hiisi is associated with good horses - in a song about travel : ".. good horses live at Hiisi’s place, on the mountains there are first-rate foals. From Hiisi take a horse, from the hard land a trotting horse, the chestnut nag of Hiisi with forelock of fire .. ". Hiisi was also assumed to assist forest hunters catching game. One folklore song gives Hiisi as the origin (creator) of the Horse, though  claims this is a substitution and that he was originally associated with the Elk, Reindeer or Ox.

The name is also invoked in songs telling of the origins of parts of other creatures including the cat's tail, and the raven's neck, body, legs, and guts, and one of its eyes. One song tells of the snake's creation from the saliva of a sleeping Hiisi, which was eaten by Syöjätär - it burned and she coughed it out - once dried out Hiisi gave it life.  (Tempo and Hiisi both appear in some forms of this creation text) The Aspen tree was also said to have come from Hiisi.

The Hornet (or wasp), closely associated with Hiisi (or Tempo) is a key element in the mythic creation of steel from iron - its sting - mistaken for honey by the smith Ilmarinen was used to harden the iron into steel - this poison was indicated as the origin of steel being used as a weapon against other people. One version of the origin of copper ore has it coming from the urine of Hilahatar (Hiisi's girl), his old woman, and his mare (horse).

Riddles
Hiisi's name was used in Finnish riddles - "Hiisi's elk" (or ".. with a hundred horns") is a pine tree; and "the neighing of Hiisi's horse in Hiisi's land" refers to thunder.

In the Kalevala
Except where noted, quotations in English are from the translation by 

There are many references to Hiisi in the Kalevala.

In Runo VI Joukahainen's bow has a drawstring made from the "elk of Hisi".

In Runo VII an evil spirit or agent called Hiisi is blamed for Väinämöinen's self-injury with his axe.

In Runo IX "Hiisi's cauldron" is mentioned as a vessel for creating enchantments.

Lemminkäinen is associated indirectly with Hiisi. He sometimes calls on Hiisi's aid, or others refer to the association as an insult. Hiisi's name is invoked in spells by Lemminkäinen. In Runo XI he silences a guard dog with the words "Stop the barker's mouth, O Hiisi", and in Runo XII, when he sings a spell calling forth warriors to aid him from the earth, the water and the forests he refers to those from the water as "Water-Hiisi". In Runo XI Lemminkäinen claims to have a sword with a "blade forged by Hiisi" and the same sword is mentioned in Runo XII as having been sharpened by Hiisi. 

Lemminkäinen's pursuit of "Hiisi's elk" is the main quest in Runo XIII. The form of this elk fulfills a curse made earlier  (lines 55-58), and it is constructed by Hiisi with a head of rotten wood, horns of willow, and other parts of sticks, reeds, and so on. 

In Runo XIV Lemminkäinen is given the task of bridling the "fire-breathing steed of Hiisi".

In Runo XVII the giant Antero Vipunen refers to Väinämöinen, who has entered his stomach and is troubling him, as a Hiisi (line 169, 277), and as a "hound of Hiisi" (line 245), while Väinämöinen refers to Vipunen's stomach as "Hiisi's stable" (line 117). 

In Runo XIX a field of serpents is said to have once been ploughed by Hiisi.

Runo XXVI includes the tale of the creation of snakes by Hiisi and Syöjätär.

In Runo XXVII the Mistress of Pohjola refers to Lemminkäinen as "scamp of Hiisi" (line 263).

In both Runo XXXIII and Runo L a woman is insulted as a "whore of Hiisi". 

There are also figurative expressions such as "Bird of Hiisi" for a wasp (Runo IX).

There are some minor references that do not fit the pattern of references to evil spirits. In Runo XVIII, for instance, there is a line,"Gently barked the castle's Hiisi", though the text make it clear that is an ordinary dog (lines 476-550).

Associated terms
Hiitola is his home/homeland; Hippa his daughter, and Kipinatar his cat.

Modern language usage
Often, the English "goblin" is translated as "hiisi" in Finnish, due to the numerous similarities between the typical goblin and hiisi. In the Finnish translations of the works of J.R.R. Tolkien, where the word "goblin" is a synonym for "Orc", hiisi is used as the translation for "goblin", whereas "orc" is translated as "örkki".

In modern Finnish, hiisi and its derivatives hitto and hittolainen are mild profanities.

In the video game Noita a faction of hostile NPCs are referred to as The Hiisi

In the Swedish fantasy drama Border (2018), the troll character Vore lays an unfertilized egg that he calls a "hiisit". He says it is a changeling.

See also
Lempo, devil type figure in Finnish folklore and myth
Piru, evil spirit in Finnish folklore
Hiis (Estonian) still carries the primary meaning of a sacred grove.
Sampo Lappelill defies Hiisi the Mountain King

Notes

Citations and references

Sources cited

 , e-text via www.gutenberg.org
 , e-text via www.gutenberg.org

Further reading

Finnish mythology
Finnish folklore
Finnish legendary creatures
Characters in the Kalevala
Landmarks in Finland